Xu Geyang (born December 15, 1996) is a Chinese singer-songwriter. In July 2016, she made her debut as a contestant on the first season of the reality television singing competition show Sing! China on Zhejiang Television. She finished fourth in the finals. She released her first single, "Forever", in May 2017.

On November 20, 2017, Xu Geyang won her first award: "The Most Promising Singer" at a Chinese music awards ceremony.

Career

2016: Became a singer

Sing! China 

In July 2016, Xu Geyang became a singer. She competed in Sing! China and joined Wang Feng's team. She passed the fighting rounds easily. In the cross-fighting round, she defeated Yu Tian (from Jay Chou's team) with a score of 35 to 16, and advanced to the semifinals. In the semifinals, she received the third highest score, 88.36, and advanced to the Top 6. In the finals, she won runner-up in Wang Feng's team and fourth place overall. During the competition, Xu Geyang was the most popular contestant with the public based on Chinese online polls.

Concerts attended in 2016

2017-2018: Self-wrote singles

Notable singles released in 2017

"Forever" 
Her first single, "Forever", was released in May 2017. She wrote lyrics and the music herself. The song was praised by critics soon after released. In June, "Forever" was chosen as the ending song for the film "Wished" 《反转人生》. At the film premier, Xu Geyang said she was interested in acting.

"Chorn" 
In December 2017, her single "Chorn" released. Xu Geyang wrote this song with two African musicians, Teddy Strings and Kenny Leonore. This song uses typical "Reggae" style. And Xu Geyang made this song's cover herself.

This song was also performed on "全球中文音乐榜上榜" by Xu Geyang herself.

Concerts attended in 2017

Notable singles released in 2018

"Distorted" 《畸变》 
In May 2018, her single "Distorted" 《畸变》 released. This song uses pure rock music.

Concerts attended in 2018

Other career

Comedy 
On November 25, 2016, Xu Geyang performed in a show in a traditional Chinese comedic style known as xiangsheng or "cross talk" with actor Sheng Lang.

Pingyao International Film Festival 
On November 2, 2017, Xu Geyang appeared on Pingyao International Film Festival as a special guest. She sang "Dream Chaser" 《追梦赤子心》 on the film festival.

Controversy 
During the competition of Sing! China, especially at the early stage of the competition, Xu Geyang was very controversial. She was criticized by many people, and there was a lot of negative news about her.

Performance on Sing! China 
Although Xu Geyang was praised by many people during the competition of Sing! China, many people also criticized her. Most of them thought she sings with roaring only. And her performing was controversial (Mainly in the early stage). Examples of criticism:

Chinese writer Liu Xinda was also disappointed with her because she couldn't enter university and there was too much negative news about her.

Family circumstance 
Before she competed in Sing! China, Xu Geyang failed in the National Higher Education Entrance Examination twice. In the blind audition of Sing! China, she said she couldn't enter university because her family was poor. But soon after, some people found that she showed many expensive things on her micro-blog, such as imported snakes, top-brand bags and even the iphone 6Splus. This has caused many people to doubt her family circumstances.

Sex tape 
On August 2, 2016, a sex tape published on Sina Weibo and WeChat, claiming it depicted Xu Geyang having sex with Wang Feng. Xu Geyang herself, Wang's studio, the producers of Sing! China, and Wang's wife, actress Zhang Ziyi, all spoke out against the video, saying it was fake.

Discography

Singles

Awards 
In November 2017, Xu Geyang won "The Most Promising Singer" award at a Chinese music awards ceremony.

See also 
 Sing! China (season 1)

References

External links 
 Xu Geyang's all singles on NetEase Music
 Xu Geyang's Sina Weibo

1996 births
Living people
Musicians from Shenyang
Singers from Liaoning
21st-century Chinese women singers